Fanni Garát-Gasparics  (born 20 November 1994) is a Hungarian ice hockey forward and member of the Hungarian national ice hockey team, currently playing in the Premier Hockey Federation (PHF) with the Metropolitan Riveters.

Playing career  
She was selected by the Minnesota Whitecaps in the 2021 NWHL International Draft on 25 July 2021.

International play 
Garát-Gasparics represented Hungary at the 2012 IIHF World Women's U18 Championship – Division I and was a standout player on the team as they claimed gold in the tournament and gained promotion to the Top Division. Hungary, a newcomer to the World U18 stage, went undefeated in the tournament to produce what was long considered the greatest success in the history of the Hungarian women's ice hockey. Garát-Gasparics ranked second in scoring of all players participating in the tournament, with 2 goals and 8 assists for 10 points, only trailing linemate Alexandra Huszák's 7 goals and 3 assists.

In January 2012, Garát-Gasparics also represented Hungary at the first ever Winter Youth Olympics, competing in the individual skills challenge, where she came second and collected the silver medal.

Awards and honors
Directorate Award, Best Forward, 2019 IIHF Women's World Championship Division I

References

External links
 
 

1994 births
Living people
HC Agidel Ufa players
Belye Medveditsy players
Fakel Chelyabinsk players
Hungarian expatriate sportspeople in Russia
Hungarian expatriate sportspeople in the United States
Hungarian women's ice hockey forwards
Ice hockey people from Budapest
Ice hockey players at the 2012 Winter Youth Olympics
KMH Budapest (women) players
MAC Budapest (women) players
Metropolitan Riveters players
20th-century Hungarian women
21st-century Hungarian women